State Highway 7 is a major New Zealand state highway. Distances are measured from east to west with the major junction list going from east to west.

For most of its length SH 7 is a two-lane single carriageway, with at-grade intersections and property accesses, both in rural and urban areas. There are a number of passing lanes at irregular intervals through the rural sections. The New Zealand Transport Agency classifies SH 7 as a primary collector highway, preferring  via Arthur's Pass as the strategic highway between Canterbury and the West Coast.

Route
The highway leaves SH 1 at Waipara, some 60 kilometres north of Christchurch, and initially heads north, crossing several rivers and skirting the Balmoral State Forest. After crossing the Hurunui River there is a 13.7 km straight, the longest straight section of highway in New Zealand. Just north of Culverden, it reaches the valley of the Waiau River and turns west to the course of this river and its tributary the Lewis River up the valley to the 907-metre Lewis Pass, the northernmost of the three main road passes across the Southern Alps.

On the western side of the pass, the highway enters the small spa town of Maruia Springs, before continuing northwest along the valley of the Maruia River to Springs Junction, where it meets SH 65. From here, the highway crosses a smaller pass, the Rahu Saddle, before following the valley of the Inangahua River to the town of Reefton.

From Reefton, the highway turns southwest at the intersection with SH 69, following the course of the Grey River to within two kilometres of its mouth at Greymouth, where SH 7 terminates at its junction with SH 6.

Spur sections
SH 7 has one spur, designated State Highway 7A. This 9.4 kilometre stretch links State Highway 7 at the Waiau bridge with the alpine thermal resort town of Hanmer Springs.

Major intersections

See also
List of New Zealand state highways
List of roads and highways, for notable or famous roads worldwide

References

External links
 New Zealand Transport Agency

7